The 1990–91 Frauen-Bundesliga was the first season of the Frauen-Bundesliga, the premier women's association football league in Germany after the previous seventeen years saw the league be competed in a single-elimination tournament. Twenty teams competed in two separate groups of ten with the top two teams from each group qualifying through to the final.

In the final, it was TSV Siegen who claimed the first Frauen-Bundesliga as they defeated FSV Frankfurt 4–2 in the final.

Northern conference

Final standings

Results

Southern conference

Final standings

Results

Semi-finals

Final

Top scorers

Qualification

Group North

Group South 1

Group South 2

References

1990-91
Ger
1
Women